FGL Sports Ltd. was a Canadian sporting goods retailer based in Calgary, Alberta. It operated under these corporate banners: Sport Chek, Atmosphere (renamed from Coast Mountain Sports), Sport Mart (all stores closed as of March 2013), National Sports, Pro Hockey Life, Athletes World (all stores closed as of March 2013), Sports Experts, Intersport, Tech Shop, RnR, Hockey Experts, Nevada Bob's Golf, The Fitness Source (all stores closed), Pegasus, S3, Econosports and Sports Rousseau.

In 2011, Canadian Tire bought FGL Sports Ltd. (referred to as Forzani Group Ltd. prior to being renamed upon acquisition) for $771 million, and has since embarked on a large scale brand restructuring.

References 

Companies based in Calgary
Sporting goods retailers of Canada
Canadian Tire
2011 mergers and acquisitions